The 1962 Women's Western Open was contested from May 10–13 at Montgomery Country Club. It was the 33rd edition of the Women's Western Open.

This event was won by Mickey Wright on the fourth hole of a sudden-death playoff with Mary Lena Faulk.

Final leaderboard

External links
The Spokesman-Review source

Women's Western Open
Golf in Alabama
Sports in Montgomery, Alabama
Women's Western Open
Women's Western Open
Women's Western Open
Women's Western Open
Women's sports in Alabama